Akbarpur Girls Inter College is situated in the heart of the town Akbarpur, Kanpur Dehat district, in Uttar Pradesh, India. This government aided institution is affiliated with U P Madhyamik Shiksha Parishad Allahabad.

Location
The college is located near the old Tehsil building in the heart of Akbarpur, Kanpur Dehat, and is one kilometer from the Kanpur-Agra National Highway.

History
This school was founded by Ram Balak Mishra as an upper primary school in 1973, and it came in the aid list in 1981.  It was upgraded to a High School in 1986, and became aided in 1991. In 1999, this school was upgraded to Intermediate.

Management
President:Rama Kant Mishra
Manager:Shankar Dutt Tripathi

List of Principals
 Smt. Vishnu Kanti Mishra (Founder)-1972 
 Shashi Bala Pandey (1973- June 2002)- Head Mistress till 1999. 
 Sharoj Mani Dwivedi (July 2002 - June 2010)
 Swaroop Rani Bajpai (July 2010 - March 2017)
 Munni Devi Dixit  (April 2017--till date)

Gallery

References

Girls' schools in Uttar Pradesh
High schools and secondary schools in Uttar Pradesh
Intermediate colleges in Uttar Pradesh
Education in Kanpur Dehat district
Educational institutions established in 1973
1973 establishments in Uttar Pradesh